The Lampo class was a class of six destroyers of the Italian Regia Marina (Royal Navy) built by the German Schichau shipyard from 1899–1901. They served in the Italo-Turkish War (where one was lost) and the surviving ships in the First World War, before being disposed of between 1920 and 1924.

Design
In 1899, the Italian Navy ordered six destroyers from the German shipyard Schichau-Werke of Elbing, Prussia (now Elbląg in Poland). The design was typical for Schichau-designed destroyers of the period, with a raised turtleback forecastle, a ram bow and two funnels.

Displacement was  normal and  full load.

Gun armament varied between ships. Torpedo armament consisted of two  torpedo tubes. The ships' crew consisted of 59 officers and men.

The six ships were laid down between 1899 and 1900 and completed between 1900 and 1902. While the ships were fast, reaching speeds of over  during sea trials (corresponding to a realistic sea speed of ), seaworthiness was poor.

Service
The ships of the class were active during the Italo-Turkish War of 1911–1912. One ship, Freccia ran aground in a storm off Tripoli, Libya, on 12 October 1911, a few days after the city was captured by the Italians. Other ships in the class took part in operations along the coast of Libya, and in the Dodecanese.

In 1914, the remaining ships of the class formed part of the 6th Destroyer Division, based in Libya. During the First World War, the ships of the class were modified for minelaying, being fitted to carry at least 12 mines. The ships were used as escorts in North African waters and in the Tyrrhenian Sea, and as such carried depth charges and anti-submarine sweeps.

The ships of the class were disposed on during the early 1920s, with the last one stricken in November 1924.

Ships

Notes

Citations

References

External links
 Classe Lampo  Marina Militare website

Destroyer classes
 
World War I naval ships of Italy
Destroyers of Germany